Donabate railway station (Irish: Stáisiún Dhomhnach Bat) serves Donabate in Fingal. It is part of the Irish Rail network and is not yet served by DART services. The nearest DART station is the previous station,  Malahide

Description
The station has two platforms, one for each of the two lines which run through the station. Built in the mid-19th century, the station has a traditional appearance. The booking office has a small waiting area. There are two ticket-issuing machines and one part-time staffed window for the purchase of tickets. The station is located in the centre of the town.

When the station was opened there was no footbridge built.  When CIÉ closed Midleton station in Cork, the GS&WR iron footbridge was moved to Donabate.  This footbridge was subsequently removed in 2011 and replaced by a new bridge with steps and lifts for increased accessibility. In 2013, a new building was built on the platform containing ticket barriers.  Whilst Midleton has since been reopened.

Donabate is served by 22000 Class and 29000 Class diesel railcars. However 201 Class locomotives + DeDietrichrolling stock pass through on Enterprise services as do 071 Class locomotives + Tara Mines Wagons with mineral ore trains from Boliden Tara Mines near Navan.

The linespeed in Donabate is 90 mph, the highest on the Dublin-Belfast railway line and the highest permittable speed of the DeDietrich coaches.

The station has two lifts and a footbridge connecting Platforms 1 and 2.

In 2015, Irish Rail closed the toilets at the station as part of a cost-cutting measure.

Future proposals
Under Transport 21, there were plans to continue the DART from Malahide railway station, through Donabate railway station and up to Drogheda railway station by 2015. However, this was delayed due to the Great Recession and was shelved in 2015 to make way for the development of the MetroLink. Subsequent long-term expansion plans have ambitions to electrify the station by 2040.

See also
 List of railway stations in Ireland

References

External links

 Irish Rail Donabate Station Website

Iarnród Éireann stations in Fingal
Railway stations opened in 1844
Railway stations in Fingal
Railway stations in the Republic of Ireland opened in 1844